Jerry Mays may refer to:
Jerry Mays (defensive lineman) (1939–1994), American football player for the Kansas City Chiefs
Jerry Mays (running back) (born 1967), American football player for the San Diego Chargers
Gerry Mays (1921–2006), Scottish football player

See also
Jerry May (disambiguation)